Bcl-2 (B-cell lymphoma 2), encoded in humans by the BCL2 gene, is the founding member of the Bcl-2 family of regulator proteins that regulate cell death (apoptosis), by either inhibiting (anti-apoptotic) or inducing (pro-apoptotic) apoptosis. It was the first apoptosis regulator identified in any organism.

Bcl-2 derives its name from B-cell lymphoma 2, as it is the second member of a range of proteins initially described in chromosomal translocations involving chromosomes 14 and 18 in follicular lymphomas. Orthologs (such as Bcl2 in mice) have been identified in numerous mammals for which complete genome data are available.

Like BCL3, BCL5, BCL6, BCL7A, BCL9, and BCL10, it has clinical significance in lymphoma.

Isoforms 

The two isoforms of Bcl-2, Isoform 1, and Isoform 2, exhibit a similar fold. However, results in the ability of these isoforms to bind to the BAD and BAK proteins, as well as in the structural topology and electrostatic potential of the binding groove, suggest differences in antiapoptotic activity for the two isoforms.

Normal physiological function

BCL-2 is localized to the outer membrane of mitochondria, where it plays an important role in promoting cellular survival and inhibiting the actions of pro-apoptotic proteins. The pro-apoptotic proteins in the BCL-2 family, including Bax and Bak, normally act on the mitochondrial membrane to promote permeabilization and release of cytochrome c and ROS, that are important signals in the apoptosis cascade. These pro-apoptotic proteins are in turn activated by BH3-only proteins, and are inhibited by the function of BCL-2 and its relative BCL-Xl.

There are additional non-canonical roles of BCL-2 that are being explored. BCL-2 is known to regulate mitochondrial dynamics, and is involved in the regulation of mitochondrial fusion and fission. Additionally, in pancreatic beta-cells, BCL-2 and BCL-Xl are known to be involved in controlling metabolic activity and insulin secretion, with inhibition of BCL-2/Xl showing increasing metabolic activity, but also additional ROS production; this suggests it has a protective metabolic effect in conditions of high demand.

Role in disease 

Damage to the Bcl-2 gene has been identified as a cause of a number of cancers, including melanoma, breast, prostate, chronic lymphocytic leukemia, and lung cancer, and a possible cause of schizophrenia and autoimmunity. It is also a cause of resistance to cancer treatments.

Cancer
Cancer can be seen as a disturbance in the homeostatic balance between cell growth and cell death. Over-expression of anti-apoptotic genes, and under-expression of pro-apoptotic genes, can result in the lack of cell death that is characteristic of cancer. An example can be seen in lymphomas. The over-expression of the anti-apoptotic Bcl-2 protein in lymphocytes alone does not cause cancer. But simultaneous over-expression of Bcl-2 and the proto-oncogene myc may produce aggressive B-cell malignancies including lymphoma. In follicular lymphoma, a chromosomal translocation commonly occurs between the fourteenth and the eighteenth chromosomes – t(14;18) – which places the Bcl-2 gene from chromosome 18 next to the immunoglobulin heavy chain locus on chromosome 14. This fusion gene is deregulated, leading to the transcription of excessively high levels of Bcl-2. This decreases the propensity of these cells for apoptosis. Bcl-2 expression is frequent in small cell lung cancer, accounting for 76% cases in one study.

Auto-immune diseases
Apoptosis plays an active role in regulating the immune system. When it is functional, it can cause immune unresponsiveness to self-antigens via both central and peripheral tolerance. In the case of defective apoptosis, it may contribute to etiological aspects of autoimmune diseases. The autoimmune disease type 1 diabetes can be caused by defective apoptosis, which leads to aberrant T cell AICD and defective peripheral tolerance. Due to the fact that dendritic cells are the immune system's most important antigen-presenting cells, their activity must be tightly regulated by mechanisms such as apoptosis. Researchers have found that mice containing dendritic cells that are Bim -/-, thus unable to induce effective apoptosis, have autoimmune diseases more so than those that have normal dendritic cells. Other studies have shown that dendritic cell lifespan may be partly controlled by a timer dependent on anti-apoptotic Bcl-2.

Other 

Apoptosis plays an important role in regulating a variety of diseases. For example, schizophrenia is a psychiatric disorder in which an abnormal ratio of pro- and anti-apoptotic factors may contribute towards pathogenesis. Some evidence suggests that this may result from abnormal expression of Bcl-2 and increased expression of caspase-3.

Diagnostic use 

Antibodies to Bcl-2 can be used with immunohistochemistry to identify cells containing the antigen. In healthy tissue, these antibodies react with B-cells in the mantle zone, as well as some T-cells. However, positive cells increase considerably in follicular lymphoma, as well as many other forms of cancer. In some cases, the presence or absence of Bcl-2 staining in biopsies may be significant for the patient's prognosis or likelihood of relapse.

Targeted therapies 

Targeted and selective Bcl-2 inhibitors that have been in development or are currently in the clinic include:

Oblimersen
An antisense oligonucleotide drug, oblimersen (G3139), was developed by Genta Incorporated to target Bcl-2. An antisense DNA or RNA strand is non-coding and complementary to the coding strand (which is the template for producing respectively RNA or protein). An antisense drug is a short sequence of RNA that hybridises with and inactivates mRNA, preventing the protein from being formed.

Human lymphoma cell proliferation (with t(14;18) translocation) could be inhibited by antisense RNA targeted at the start codon region of Bcl-2 mRNA. In vitro studies led to the identification of Genasense, which is complementary to the first 6 codons of Bcl-2 mRNA.

These showed successful results in Phase I/II trials for lymphoma. A large Phase III trial was launched in 2004. As of 2016, the drug had not been approved and its developer was out of business.

ABT-737 and navitoclax (ABT-263)

In the mid-2000s, Abbott Laboratories developed a novel inhibitor of Bcl-2, Bcl-xL and Bcl-w, known as ABT-737. This compound is part of a group of BH3 mimetic small molecule inhibitors (SMI) that target these Bcl-2 family proteins, but not A1 or Mcl-1. ABT-737 is superior to previous BCL-2 inhibitors given its higher affinity for Bcl-2, Bcl-xL and Bcl-w. In vitro studies showed that primary cells from patients with B-cell malignancies are sensitive to ABT-737. ABT-737 does not directly induce apoptosis; it enhances the effects of apoptotic signals and causes single-agent-mechanism-based killing of cells in small-cell lung carcinoma and lymphoma lines.

In animal models, it improves survival, causes tumor regression and cures a high percentage of mice. In preclinical studies utilizing patient xenografts, ABT-737 showed efficacy for treating lymphoma and other blood cancers. Because of its unfavorable pharmacologic properties ABT-737 is not appropriate for clinical trials, while its orally bioavailable derivative navitoclax (ABT-263) has similar activity on small cell lung cancer (SCLC) cell lines and has entered clinical trials. While clinical responses with navitoclax were promising, mechanistic dose-limiting thrombocytopenia was observed in patients under treatment due to Bcl-xL inhibition in platelets.

Venetoclax (ABT-199)
Due to dose-limiting thrombocytopenia of navitoclax as a result of Bcl-xL inhibition, Abbvie successfully developed the highly selective inhibitor venetoclax (ABT-199), which inhibits Bcl-2, but not Bcl-xL or Bcl-w. Clinical trials studied the effects of venetoclax, a BH3-mimetic drug designed to block the function of the Bcl-2 protein, on patients with chronic lymphocytic leukemia (CLL). Good responses have been reported and thrombocytopenia was no longer observed. A phase 3 trial started in Dec 2015.
It was approved by the US FDA in April 2016 as a second-line treatment for CLL associated with 17-p deletion. This was the first FDA approval of a BCL-2 inhibitor. In June 2018, the FDA broadened the approval for anyone with CLL or small lymphocytic lymphoma, with or without 17p deletion, still as a second-line treatment.

Interactions 

Bcl-2 has been shown to interact with:

 BAK1, 
 BCAP31, 
 BCL2-like 1, 
 BCL2L11, 
 BECN1, 
 BID, 
 BMF, 
 BNIP2, 
 BNIP3, 
 BNIPL, 
 BAD 
 BAX, 
 BIK, 
 C-Raf, 
 CAPN2, 
 CASP8, 
 Cdk1, 
 HRK, 
 IRS1,
 Myc, 
 NR4A1, 
 Noxa, 
 PPP2CA, 
 PSEN1, 
 RAD9A, 
 RRAS, 
 RTN4, 
 SMN1, 
 SOD1, and
 TP53BP2.

See also 

 Apoptosome
 Bcl-2 homologous antagonist killer (BAK)
 Bcl-2-associated X protein (BAX)
 BH3 interacting domain death agonist (BID)
 Caspases
 Noxa
 Microphthalmia-associated transcription factor
 Protein mimetic
 p53 upregulated modulator of apoptosis (PUMA)

 Senolytics

References

External links 
 The Bcl-2 Family Database
 The Bcl-2 Family at celldeath.de
 
 
 
 

Integral membrane proteins
Peripheral membrane proteins
Oncogenes
Apoptosis
Programmed cell death